Deutsche Leasing AG (DL) is the largest manufacturer-independent leasing company in Germany. Since 1987, the company has had its headquarters in Bad Homburg vor der Höhe and is the centre of excellence for leasing for the Sparkassen-Finanzgruppe. Shares are held by approximately 400 Sparkassen (savings banks), either directly or indirectly through holding companies. Deutsche Leasing is the sole shareholder of Deutsche Anlagen-Leasing in Wiesbaden.

History 
"Deutsche Leasing GmbH", Germany's first leasing company, was entered in the Commercial Register in Düsseldorf in 1962. The two other predecessor companies of Deutsche Leasing "Maschinen-Miete GmbH" and "Mietdienst GmbH" were founded some time later. In 1971, these three companies merged to form Deutsche Leasing AG. Until 1991 the founder of "Maschinen-Miete GmbH", Albrecht Dietz, was Chairman of the Board of the new company.
 
Deutsche Leasing is today the largest manufacturer-independent leasing company in Germany.

Products 
Deutsche Leasing's first leasing object and therefore the first leasable investment in Germany was a 1962 Sweda cash register. Today, Deutsche Leasing AG offers a full range of leasing services, in both the movables and real-estate markets:

 Vehicle leasing (passenger vehicles, commercial vehicles, vehicle fleets, vehicle trading)
 Machines leasing (agricultural technology, construction equipment, printing presses, plastic manufacturing plant, medical technology, machine tools)
 IT and communications leasing (hardware leasing, software leasing, software project leasing)
 Energy development leasing (for example, renewable energy, power stations, heating systems)
 Real estate leasing

Overseas companies 
With increasing internationalisation, since 1993 Deutsche Leasing has joined its German customers in the major export markets of Europe, Asia and the Americas. It has subsidiaries in Austria, Belgium, Brazil, Bulgaria, Canada, China, Czech Republic, France, Hungary, Ireland, Italy, Luxembourg, Netherlands, Poland, Portugal, Romania, Russia, Sweden, Slovakia, Spain, United Kingdom and in the United States.

External links

 Deutsche Leasing Website

References

Financial services companies of Germany
Leasing companies
Companies based in Hesse